International Volunteer HQ Limited (IVHQ) is a New Zealand-based volunteer travel company founded by Daniel John Radcliffe in 2007. In September 2015, it has sent 50,000 volunteers overseas to 30 countries on 200 different projects. In November 2017, the Sydney investment company Mercury Capital acquired a majority stake in IVHQ.

Services and activities
The organization facilitates affordable volunteer trips abroad, enabling travelers to explore the world in a meaningful way. IVHQ focuses on matching volunteers with projects that are locally led and have a focus on long term sustainability. Volunteer projects cover a broad range of skills which includes childcare, teaching, medical, wildlife, environmental, construction, arts, sports, NGO Support, refugee support, women's empowerment, sea turtle and marine conservation, community development, elderly care and special needs care.  Today, IVHQ has placed more than 100,000 international volunteers in more than 40 countries.

History
IVHQ was started in 2007, when Daniel Radcliffe volunteered in Kenya. He found the experience to be over-priced and unfulfilling, and set out to make volunteering abroad more affordable, responsible and rewarding. IVHQ was initially started on his family farm in Taranaki, New Zealand.  Now it employs more than 40 people and includes a sister company, Intern Abroad HQ, that places interns around the world on career-focused opportunities.

In 2015, IVHQ became an independently certified B Corporation.

In November 2017, Sydney-based firm Mercury Capital purchased an 80% majority stake in IVHQ.

References

External links

New Zealand companies established in 2007
International volunteer organizations
Mercury Capital
Privately held companies of New Zealand
Service companies of New Zealand
Education companies established in 2007
2017 mergers and acquisitions
B Lab-certified corporations